Yum and Yummer is an American food reality television series that airs on Cooking Channel. The series is presented by chef Eddie Jackson; although he does not taste any of the food so should be considered more of an advert than a review and features Jackson showcasing indulgent food dishes from around the world.

Yum and Yummer premiered on February 10, 2019.

Episodes

Season 1 (2019)

Season 2 (2020)

Season 3 (2021)

Notes

References

External links
 
 

2010s American cooking television series
2019 American television series debuts
Cooking Channel original programming
English-language television shows
Food reality television series